Further Down the Old Plank Road is a 2003 album by The Chieftains. It is a collaboration between the Irish band and many top country music musicians including Rosanne Cash, Chet Atkins, The Nitty Gritty Dirt Band, Ricky Skaggs, and Patty Loveless.

Track listing
 "The Raggle Taggle Gypsy" - Nickel Creek   
 "Jordan is a Hard Road to Travel" - John Hiatt   
 "Hick's Farewell" - Allison Moorer   
 "Shady Grove" - Tim O'Brien  
 "The Girl I Left Behind" - John Prine   
 "Rosc Catha Na Nuimhain / Arkansas Traveller / The Wild Irishman" - Jerry Douglas   
 "Lambs in the Greenfield" - Emmylou Harris   
 "The Moonshiner / I'm a Rambler" - Joe Ely   
 "Wild Mountain Thyme" - Don Williams   
 "Chief O'Neill's Hornpipe" - Chet Atkins
 "Bandit of Love / The Cheatin' Waltz" - Carlene Carter
 "The Squid Jiggin' Ground / Larry O'Gaff" - The Nitty Gritty Dirt Band   
 "Three Little Babes" - Patty Loveless   
 "Fisherman's Hornpipe / The Devil's Dream" - Doc Watson   
 "Talk About Suffering / Man of the House" - Ricky Skaggs   
 "The Lily of the West" - Rosanne Cash

Personnel
The Chieftains
 Paddy Moloney - bagpipes [Uilleann], tin whistle
 Kevin Conneff - bodhrán, vocals
 Derek Bell - dulcimer [Tiompán], harp, keyboards
 Seán Keane - fiddle
 Matt Molloy - flute

Guests
 Jeff White - acoustic guitar, mandolin, vocals (1-8,13,16)
 Sara Watkins - fiddle, vocals (1)
 Sean Watkins - acoustic guitar (1)
 Christopher Thile - mandolin, vocals (1)
 Byron House - double bass (1)
 Caroline Lavelle - cello (1,16)
 Shannon Forrest - drums, (2-4,6,8,13)
 Bryan Sutton - banjo, mandolin, octave mandolin (2-3,6-7)
 Barry Bales - double bass (2-3,6)
 Stuart Duncan - fiddle (2,7)
 John Hiatt - guitar, vocals (2)
 Jeff Taylor - accordion (2)
 Randy Kohrs - resonator guitar [Dobro] (3-4,7,13)
 Allison Moorer - vocals (3)
 Pete Wasner - keyboards (3)
 Glenn Worf - bass, double bass (4,7,13)
 Tim O'Brien - mandolin, vocals (4)
 Matt Rollings - piano (5,8)
 Mike Bub - double bass (5,8)
 John Prine - vocals (5)
 Frankie Lane - resonator guitar [Dobro] (5)
 Kenny Malone - drums (5)
 Mairtin O'Connor - accordion (5)
 Jerry Douglas - resonator guitar [Dobro] (6,12)
 Emmylou Harris - vocals (7)
 Joe Ely - vocals (8)
 Edgar Meyer - bass (9,12)
 Don Williams - guitar, vocals (9)
 Béla Fleck - banjo (10,12,15)
 Chet Atkins - guitar (10)
 David Hungate - bass (10)
 Carlene Carter - vocals (11)
 Kevin Bents - piano (11)
 Adam Frehm - resonator guitar [Dobro] (11)
 Mike Gordon - bass (11)
 Sharon Shannon - accordion (11)
 Jimmy Ibbotson - guitar (12)
 Jeff Hanna - guitar, vocals (12)
 Jimmy Fadden - drums, harmonica (12)
 Patty Loveless - vocals (13)
 Tim O'Brien - mandolin (13)
 Doc Watson - guitar (14)
 Merle Watson - Guitar (14)
 T. Michael Coleman - bass (14)
 Hank "Bones" Kahn - bones (14)
 Barry Carroll - dulcimer, harp (14)
 Triona Marshall - harp (14)
 Ricky Skaggs - vocals (15)
 Paul Brewster - backing vocals (15)
 Rosanne Cash - vocals (16)
 John Leventhal - acoustic guitar (16)
 Michael Gordon - acoustic bass (16)
 Tom Partington - vintage rope drum (16)
 Margaret Dorn - backing vocals (16)
 Caroline Goodgold - backing vocals (16)
 Deborah Lyons - backing vocals (16)
 Teddy Thompson - backing vocals (16)

Chart performance

References

2003 albums
The Chieftains albums
Collaborative albums
RCA Victor albums